Sir Richard Kemp (c. 1600 – c. 1650) was a politician in the Colony of Virginia who served as the acting Colonial Governor of Virginia from 1644 to 1645 in the stead of Sir William Berkeley. Kemp also served on the Governor's Council from 1634 to 1649 working in close relation with Sir John Harvey. 

King Charles I named Kemp secretary of the Virginia colony in 1634.

Kemp finished his career in Jamestown and had built the first all-brick house in the colony before retiring from his political career to a 1,200-acre plantation in Rich Neck.

Early and family life 
Kemp was born around 1600 in Norfolk, England, the third son of Robert and Dorothy Kemp of Gissing.

Political career 
In 1634, Kemp was appointed by King Charles I to the role of secretary of the Colony of Virginia and as a senior member of the Virginia Governor's Council, serving from 1634 to 1649. Kemp was a political ally and friend of Sir John Harvey, the first royally appointed Colonial Governor of Virginia. 

In 1636, Kemp purchased the Rich Neck Plantation in James City County, Virginia, in what is now known as Newport News. Kemp was one of the first plantation owners in the Colony of Virginia to use an enslaved workforce. 

As the secretary of the colony, Kemp was responsible for issuing permits and grants, handling legal paperwork, and overseeing all official correspondence with the King. In 1639, Kemp had started to lose favor in the colonies after siding with Sir John Harvey and the support he gave that led to the Second Anglo-Powhatan War. Kemp stowed away to England to plead his case to King Charles I to allow him to resume his duties as Secretary for the Colony of Virginia. Kemp returned to Virginia in 1642 with the colonies new appointed governor, Sir William Berkeley. 

He assumed the role of acting Colonial Governor in June 1644 just after the third Anglo-Powhatan War, while Governor William Berkeley traveled to England to purchase arms and weaponry to defend the colony from Indian attacks. 

Kemp resigned from his positions as secretary and member of the council in 1649 due to declining health.

Marriage and child 
Kemp married Elizabeth Wormeley, the daughter of Judge Christopher Wormeley. They had one daughter, Elizabeth.

Death 
Kemp died around 1650 at the Rich Neck Plantation and was buried at the orchard there.

References 

1600 births
1650 deaths
American slave owners
Colonial governors of Virginia
English emigrants